Against da Grain is the debut studio album by American Southern hip hop duo YoungBloodZ from Atlanta, Georgia. It was released on October 12, 1999 via LaFace Records. The album features guest appearances from Backbone, Big Boi, Bone Crusher and Lil' Wayne. It peaked at number 92 on the Billboard 200 and at number 21 on the Top R&B/Hip-Hop Albums chart in the United States.

Track listing

Charts

References

External links

1999 debut albums
YoungBloodZ albums
LaFace Records albums
Albums produced by Organized Noize